Canada competed at the 1980 Winter Paralympics in Geilo, Norway from 1 to 7 February 1980. Canada sent a team of 20 athletes in two of the three disciplines at the Games; eleven in Alpine skiing and nine in Cross-country skiing.

Medalists

Alpine skiing

Men

Women

Cross-country skiing

Men

Women

See also
Canada at the 1980 Winter Olympics
Canada at the Paralympics

References

External links
Canadian Paralympic Committee official website
International Paralympic Committee official website

Nations at the 1980 Winter Paralympics
1980
Paralympics